The Sengkang Community Hospital (abbreviation: SKCH) is a 400-bed community hospital in Sengkang, Singapore, next to Cheng Lim LRT station. It is part of an integrated healthcare development that includes the Sengkang General Hospital (abbreviated to SKH).

References

External links 
 SingHealth Community Hospitals

Hospitals in Singapore
Sengkang
Anchorvale
2018 establishments in Singapore